Daniel Bethell (born 28 January 1996) is a British Para-badminton player. He has a lower limb disability and played his first tournament in 2013. He won silver at the 2020 Summer Paralympics. Bethell is currently ranked world number one in para-badminton men’s singles SL3.

Achievements

Paralympic Games 
Men's singles SL3

World Championships 

Men's singles

Men's doubles

Mixed doubles

European Championships 
Men's singles

Men's doubles

Mixed doubles

BWF Para Badminton World Circuit (5 titles, 1 runner-up) 
The BWF Para Badminton World Circuit – Grade 2, Level 1, 2 and 3 tournaments has been sanctioned by the Badminton World Federation from 2022.

Men's singles

International Tournaments (9 titles, 7 runners-up) 
Men's singles

Men's doubles

References 

British disabled sportspeople
1996 births
Living people
Paralympic badminton players of Great Britain
Badminton players at the 2020 Summer Paralympics
Medalists at the 2020 Summer Paralympics
British para-badminton players
English male badminton players

Notes